Abel Luís da Silva Costa Xavier (born 30 November 1972) is a Portuguese football manager and former professional footballer who played as a right-back.

Xavier played for clubs in Portugal, Italy, Spain, the Netherlands, England, Turkey and Germany before retiring with the LA Galaxy of Major League Soccer (MLS) in 2008. He represented both Merseyside rivals Everton and Liverpool in the Premier League.

From his debut in 1993, Xavier played 20 games for the Portugal national team, and was selected in their squads for UEFA Euro 2000 and 2002 FIFA World Cup. He later became a manager for several Portuguese clubs and the Mozambique national team.

Club career

Early career
Xavier debuted in the Portuguese top division with Estrela da Amadora. His play there earned him a transfer to Lisbon club Benfica. He helped Benfica win the Portuguese league in 1994, and a season after, he moved to Serie A side Bari. This stint with the Italian club started a series of transfers across Europe: in 1996, Xavier was sent to Real Oviedo, then after two seasons he moved to PSV.

Everton and Liverpool
Xavier joined English Premier League club Everton in September 1999 on a £1.5 million transfer deal. He was sold to Everton's Merseyside rivals Liverpool on 30 January 2002 for £800,000. He was signed to bolster Liverpool's defence following Markus Babbel's absence through illness. Xavier scored on his Liverpool debut against Ipswich Town. He also scored against Bayer Leverkusen in the UEFA Champions League. Liverpool ended the 2001–02 FA Premier League season as runners-up to Arsenal.

Xavier started the first four league games of the 2002–03 FA Premier League season but later argued with Liverpool manager Gérard Houllier and did not feature in any of the remaining games, though he did play in a League Cup tie against Ipswich in December. On 29 January 2003, he was loaned to Turkish side Galatasaray for the remainder of the season, with an option of a permanent move in the summer. Galatasaray did not take up the option to sign Xavier, who subsequently played for Hannover 96 (2003–04) and Roma in 2004–05.

Middlesbrough
At the start of the 2005–06 season, Xavier was without a club but at the end of August, he signed for Middlesbrough to replace Michael Reiziger after the Dutchman was sold to PSV.

Following the UEFA Cup tie against Skoda Xanthi on 29 September, Xavier was administered a drugs test and failed. On 23 November 2005, he was found guilty of using the anabolic steroid methandrostenolone (also known as dianabol), and banned from professional football for 18 months. He said that the substance came from anti-virus medicine that he had imported from the United States. While other players had failed tests for recreational substances, Xavier became the first Premier League player to be found guilty of using performance-enhancing drugs. The suspension caused him to miss Middlesbrough's run to the 2006 UEFA Cup final. Xavier remained employed by the club and unsuccessfully appealed the decision; in January 2006 he said that he would take UEFA to the Court of Arbitration for Sport.

Xavier's ban was shortened to 12 months in June 2006, making him eligible to play again from November 2006. In the summer of 2006, he began training again with Middlesbrough, and on 8 November 2006, was offered a contract with the club for the remainder of the 2006–07 season. He scored his first Boro goal on 20 January 2007 in a 5–1 win against Bolton Wanderers at the Riverside Stadium.

LA Galaxy
On 14 May 2007, it was announced that Xavier was to join the LA Galaxy of Major League Soccer (MLS). He played in his first game with the Galaxy on 17 June 2007 at home against Real Salt Lake, setting up fellow new signing Edson Buddle in a 3–2 win.

Xavier was waived by Los Angeles on 18 July 2008. Later, in an interview to an online football site, Xavier criticised Galaxy manager Ruud Gullit and the league itself. In December 2009, Xavier quit professional football.

International career
Xavier was a part of the Portugal squad which came third at the 1989 FIFA U-16 World Championship in Scotland.

Xavier's full international debut for senior team came on 31 March 1993, away in Switzerland in qualification for the 1994 FIFA World Cup. He played three more matches in the unsuccessful qualification campaign that year and did not play for Portugal again until 1998.

Xavier was selected for UEFA Euro 2000 and became one of the key figures in the competition, not only due to playing some of his best football but also due to a distinctly bleached-blonde hairstyle with a matching beard. In the semi-final against France, he went from close to hero, as France goalkeeper Fabien Barthez blocked what looked a sure goal, to a villain, when he deflected a shot by David Trezeguet near the post in the dying seconds of golden goal extra time with his hand. Zinedine Zidane scored the penalty and put France in the final. Xavier was initially given a nine-month ban from football for his vociferous protests against referee Günter Benkö's decision to award the penalty, but it was eventually reduced to six months. In the 2002 World Cup, he was part of the squad but played only as a substitute in the final group stage match against South Korea in his final of 20 international appearances.

Managerial career
In July 2013, Xavier signed to be manager of Portuguese top division club Olhanense for the upcoming 2013–14 Primeira Liga season. He was sacked by the club on 28 October 2013, despite beating Arouca in his last match to reach 11th in the table.

In December 2014, Xavier signed for another team from the Algarve, Farense of the Segunda Liga. He left his position on 28 May, after leading his team to the 11th position.

In July 2015, Xavier signed a one-year deal with another team in the second division, Desportivo das Aves. He was fired in early September after a series of poor results.

On 26 January 2016, he signed a two-year contract as coach of the Mozambique national team, starting work on 1 February. In December 2017, with his contract due to expire, he had it extended until the 2019 Africa Cup of Nations. After conceding an added-time goal to Guinea, the Black Mambas missed out on the tournament in Egypt but he was assured of a new deal by the Mozambican Football Federation; this offer was rescinded after a poor performance at the 2019 COSAFA Cup in South Africa.

Personal life
Xavier was born in Mozambique, which was then a Portuguese colony, and moved to Portugal as a child. He settled in Jamor in the western suburbs of Lisbon, where he lived in poverty. He grew up in a strict Catholic background. On retiring from his playing career, Xavier converted to Islam and changed his first name to Faisal.

From 2011 to 2014, Xavier was in a relationship with actress Oceana Basílio. In February 2017, with debts of €1.5 million, bankruptcy proceedings were initiated against him.

Career statistics

Club

International 

Scores and results list Portugal's goal tally first, score column indicates score after each Xavier goal.

Managerial

Honours

Club
Estrela da Amadora
Segunda Liga: 1992–93

Benfica
Primeira Liga: 1993–94
Supertaça Cândido de Oliveira: Runner-up 1994

PSV
Johan Cruijff Shield: 1998–99

Liverpool
FA Community Shield: Runner-up 2002

International
Portugal Youth
UEFA European Under-16 Championship: 1989
FIFA U-16 World Cup: Third-place 1989
UEFA Under-18 Championship: Runner-up 1990
FIFA U-20 World Cup: 1991

See also
 List of doping cases in sport

References

External links
 
 Abel Xavier career profile
 

1972 births
Living people
People from Nampula Province
Portuguese footballers
Mozambican footballers
Portugal international footballers
Portugal youth international footballers
Portugal under-21 international footballers
Portuguese people of Mozambican descent
Association football fullbacks
C.F. Estrela da Amadora players
S.L. Benfica footballers
S.S.C. Bari players
La Liga players
Real Oviedo players
PSV Eindhoven players
Everton F.C. players
Liverpool F.C. players
Galatasaray S.K. footballers
Hannover 96 players
Serie A players
A.S. Roma players
Middlesbrough F.C. players
LA Galaxy players
Premier League players
UEFA Euro 2000 players
2002 FIFA World Cup players
Mozambican emigrants to Portugal
Portuguese sportspeople in doping cases
Doping cases in association football
Bundesliga players
Primeira Liga players
Eredivisie players
Süper Lig players
Major League Soccer players
Portuguese Muslims
Converts to Islam from Roman Catholicism
Portuguese expatriate footballers
Portuguese expatriate sportspeople in Italy
Expatriate footballers in Italy
Portuguese expatriate sportspeople in Germany
Expatriate footballers in Germany
Portuguese expatriate sportspeople in England
Expatriate footballers in England
Portuguese expatriate sportspeople in Turkey
Expatriate footballers in Turkey
Portuguese expatriate sportspeople in the Netherlands
Expatriate footballers in the Netherlands
Portuguese expatriate sportspeople in Spain
Expatriate footballers in Spain
Portuguese expatriate sportspeople in the United States
Expatriate soccer players in the United States
Portuguese football managers
S.C. Olhanense managers
S.C. Farense managers
C.D. Aves managers
Primeira Liga managers
Liga Portugal 2 managers
Mozambique national football team managers
Black Portuguese sportspeople